Bandholm is a small port town and parish on the coast of northern Lolland, Region Zealand, Denmark. On 1 January 2022 it had a population of 476, and is located to the northwest of Knuthenborg Safari Park and Maribo. Stokkemarke is its west and Østofte Parish forms its southwest border. It is served by Bandholm Station. The Maribo-to-Bandholm rail branch is operated by the Museumsbanen Maribo-Bandholm as a preserved railway.

In the 1800s, Bandholm was known for a major cholera epidemic, where the fight was led by Peter Ludvig Panum in 1853.

History

Bandholm has a history going back thousands of years as can be seen from the burial mounds from the Bronze Age in the immediate neighborhood. The port seems to have been used for centuries for ships with supplies for Maribo Abbey. The area then developed with warehouses and storage facilities for goods to be sent to Maribo and Rødby. At that time it was known as Bandholm Toldsted (Bandholm Customs Point). Initially, in view of the shallow depth of the inlet, goods had to be taken out to the sailing ships by barge but in 1834 a small jetty was built to facilitate mooring. The facilities grew further with the arrival of steamships bringing corn and other foodstuffs to be transported to Maribo. The traffic intensified with the railway from Maribo to Bandholm in 1870.

The more recent history of Bandholm is linked to the Knuthenborg estate and the castle, which owned the port and also some of the houses (distinctive in their yellow exteriors) in the town and its extensive surroundings. In recent years the Knuthenborg Safari Park has made the port town a focal point of for over 200,000 tourists a year. The old port has been further improved with a state of the art marina for yachts as well as facilities on the west side of the harbor for use by boaters.

Bandholm has developed not only into a prosperous port but has also benefitted from the establishment of an iron foundry, hotels and a vibrant commercial life in connection with the railway. However, the city offers plenty of alternate opportunities for enterprising businesses, and local initiatives have ensured restoration of the heritage status of many of the old structures, especially the  granaries (for other uses) and the old railway station.

Port

The port served the town of Maribo which is located 4 miles (6 km) away with connections to Nakskov, Rødby, and Sakskøbing stations. It also had a repair facility and a building yard. Two beacons at the northeastern end of Lindhom provided the required guidance for the vessels through the approach channel to the port. For loading grain and coal, electric cranes and two grain elevators were fixed on the quay. Today, appropriate, navigational facilities are operated during the season with red lights, range lights at fixed heights, buoys, and a channel marked out with red spar buoys to facilitate navigation into and out of the harbor. The tidal fluctuation  noted every 6 hours is of the order of 1 foot at the harbor.

Notable landmarks

Bandholm Church designed by Henrik Steffens Sibbern was completed in 1874. Built of red brick in the Romanesque Revival style, it consists of a chancel, a nave and a tower with a conical spire.

A prominent wheat silo, now converted into an exhibition centre, stands on the harbor's east side while a red church with a slender spire is located near the town's west end.

Built in 1886, the Bandholm Hotel is situated on the coast road near Knuthenborg Safari Park. The Maribo-Bandholm Museum was founded in 1962; it houses the oldest running steam locomotive in the country and the oldest private railway track (1869).

Notable people 
 Knud Olsen (1919 – 2010 in Bandholm) a Danish builder and designer of boats, who designed the OK Dinghy, one of the most popular sailing dinghies; he lived and worked in Bandholm from 1961

References

External links

Cities and towns in Region Zealand
Lolland
Lolland Municipality